At the 2002 TD Waterhouse Cup doubles, Jonathan Stark and Kevin Ullyett were the defending champions but only Ullyett competed that year with Robbie Koenig.

Koenig and Ullyett lost in the first round to Petr Pála and Pavel Vízner.

Mahesh Bhupathi and Mike Bryan won in the final 6–3, 6–4 against Pála and Vízner.

Seeds
Champion seeds are indicated in bold text while text in italics indicates the round in which those seeds were eliminated.

 Mahesh Bhupathi /  Mike Bryan (champions)
 Robbie Koenig /  Kevin Ullyett (first round)
 Tomáš Cibulec /  Leander Paes (first round)
 Julien Boutter /  Arnaud Clément (quarterfinals)

Draw

External links
 2002 TD Waterhouse Cup Doubles Draw

Connecticut Open (tennis)
2002 ATP Tour